Roger Nicolas Lemon (born March 1946) is professor of neurophysiology at University College London. He is a fellow of the Academy of Medical Sciences. He was awarded the Fyssen International Prize in 2015.

References

External links
Official website

British neuroscientists
Academics of University College London
Living people
1946 births